Hong Kong competed at the 1988 Summer Paralympics in Seoul, South Korea. 42 competitors from Hong Kong won 9 medals including 2 silver and 7 bronze and finished 42nd in the medal table.

See also 
 Hong Kong at the Paralympics
 Hong Kong at the 1988 Summer Olympics

References 

Nations at the 1988 Summer Paralympics
1988
Summer Paralympics